Hot Dog Days are informal events that are celebrated in communities throughout the hotdog-eating world, including the United States, Canada and Australia. Their origin is obscure. As the name suggests, the festivals revolve around eating hot dogs, but usually there are many other activities such as wiener dog races, root beer chugging contests, and face painting. Often the proceeds from a hot dog day are given to charity. Industry groups, such as National Hot Dog and Sausage Council in the USA, encourage, sponsor, and support the events. The Council designates July as National Hot Dog Month; National Hot Dog Day varies year to year. It annually falls on the 3rd Wednesday of July, which in 2023 is July 19. The council also gives advice on hot-dog eating etiquette, which aren't considered strict, as most Hot Dog Day style events do not adhere to them.

Notable Hot Dog Festivals

Alfred Village Hot Dog Day

Hot Dog Day is celebrated every spring in the village of Alfred, New York.  It has been celebrated since 1972, when it was first created and organized by Alfred University students Mark O'Meara and Eric "Rick" Vaughn. The event is focused on the hot dog, a food popular among college students for its cheapness and ease of preparation.  In the early years, festival-goers could buy a hot dog and a drink for a quarter.  Hot Dog Day itself is usually the third Saturday in April, although many students celebrate the entire "hot dog week", running from that Wednesday to that Sunday.

Hot Dog Day, which is organized primarily by students from Alfred University and Alfred State College, raises money for local charities and community organizations such as Alfred Fire Department (A.E. Crandall Hook & Ladder Co.) and Alfred Montessori School.

Events have typically included a parade, ice cream social, "fun run", mud Olympics, hot dog eating contest, carnival, dachshund race, live music, a chicken barbecue and numerous hot dog stands. Since 1998, the engineering department has run a "Pin Hill Derby" race down Pine Hill on the north end of the Alfred University campus. Main Street is closed to traffic during the parade and originally hosted most of these activities. Since 2015, the carnival and arts & crafts fair have been held on the campuses, alternating between them each year.  Hot Dog Day is often the time chosen for alumni reunions for Alfred's two colleges. It was announced the festival would return after a two year absence due to the COVID-19 pandemic for a 50th Anniversary event in 2022, with the return of both cofounders as grand marshals.

Annual Hot Dog Lunch on Capitol Hill
The Annual Hot Dog Lunch in Washington, D.C., is one of the most popular social events on Capitol Hill.  Sponsored by the North American Meat Institute for the past 40 years, more than 1,000 members of Congress, Administration officials, journalists and lobbyists gather in a courtyard for a huge hot dog picnic. At the lunch, hot dog companies serve their franks from traditional hot dog carts and popular retired major league baseball players sign autographs for attendees.

Boston Hot Dog Safari
The Boston Hot Dog Safari is an annual charity benefit founded by Boston sports radio host Eddie Andelman. The charity began in 1990 to help find a cure for cystic fibrosis by raising money for the Joey Fund, named after a friend of his who died of the disease in 1986 at the age of twelve. One of Andelman's all-time favorite foods are hot dogs, which is why the charity is called the Hot Dog Safari.

The Hot Dog Safari is one of the most popular charity events in Boston today. Over the years, it has a gained a steady flow of participants as well as money for charity. In one single day, an estimated $150,000 dollars was raised to help find a cure for cystic fibrosis. Medical experts  said that a cure for the disease is close to being found in only a few years' time.

The Safari is an all-you-eat supply of hot dogs, sausages, and ice cream sundaes. Money is earned from tickets (sold either at the door or in advance) and raffles. Entertainment is also provided.

West Virginia Hot Dog Festival
The West Virginia Hot Dog Festival has been held in Huntington, West Virginia, on the last Saturday in July since 2005. A charitable event, the festival may raise $10,000 or more for the children's cancer unit at the Edwards' Comprehensive Cancer Center. Activities include a bun run (or walk), a weiner dog race, the owner-dog look-alike contest, a car and truck show, a hotdog eating contest, and a harmonica championship.

Other hot dog events
 Nathan's Hot Dog Eating Contest in Brooklyn, New York - an eating competition at Coney Island on USA Independence Day
 Stanley Park, Kitchener, Ontario, Optimist Club - Season End Hot Dog Day Celebration
 Kiwanis Club of Ingersoll, Ontario - Hot Dog Day
 Newburyport, Massachusetts, Hot Dog Day
 Vancouver Hot Dog Day
 Winnipeg Mennonite Elementary Schools Hot Dog Day
 Hot dog lovers in Philadelphia, Pennsylvania, celebrate National Hotdog Month by sponsoring Hot Dog Crawls, Hot Dog Safaris & Cook Offs as well as organizing free Hot Dog lunches for Veterans and kid's summer camps during July.
 Leo's Lunch & Cafe, Hackettstown NJ Annual National Hot Dog Day Celebration, Free hot dogs, contests & games.

See also
 Carnival
 Event planning
 Fair
 Festival
 Fete
 Funfair

References

Allegany County, New York
Food and drink festivals
Hot dogs
July observances
Observances about food and drink